Brodie Summers (born 18 October 1993) is an Australian freestyle skier. He competed at the FIS Freestyle World Ski Championships 2013 in Myrkdalen-Voss, and at the 2014 Winter Olympics in Sochi.

References

1993 births
Freestyle skiers at the 2014 Winter Olympics
Freestyle skiers at the 2022 Winter Olympics
Living people
Olympic freestyle skiers of Australia
Australian male freestyle skiers
Sportswomen from Western Australia
Sportspeople from Perth, Western Australia
People educated at St Michael's Grammar School